Sarah Bensaad (born 27 January 1987) is a French-Tunisian hammer thrower.

Representing France, she competed at the 2006 World Junior Championships without reaching the final and finished tenth at the 2009 European U23 Championships. She then switched her allegiance to Tunisia.

She won the gold medal at the 2011 Pan Arab Games, the silver medal at the 2011 All-Africa Games and the bronze medals at the 2012, 2014 and 2016 African Championships. She also finished ninth at the 2013 Jeux de la Francophonie

Her personal best throw is 65.93 metres, achieved in April 2014 in Bobigny.

References

1987 births
Living people
French sportspeople of Tunisian descent
French female hammer throwers
Tunisian hammer throwers
African Games medalists in athletics (track and field)
African Games silver medalists for Tunisia
Athletes (track and field) at the 2011 All-Africa Games